Multi-platform television (also known as multiplatform entertainment and transmedia storytelling) is "a mode of storytelling that plays itself out across multiple entertainment channels". Each medium that the story unfolds across makes a distinctive contribution.

Big Brother 2001 was an early multi-platform television-based project. 

The most successful transmedia franchises have emerged when a single creator or creative unit maintains control. One notable example is Lucasfilm, which has managed and cultivated its Indiana Jones (1981) and Star Wars (1977) franchises.

Today

NBC’s The Office is one example of how networks are expanding their television series to become “multi-platform.” Different characters and story arcs are able to be explored through their website and webisodes.The national broadcasters of Belgium (VRT) and Sweden (SVT) are developing the first pan-European multiplatform project named The Artists. This is based on the newly developed drama 2.0 format.

References

Sources
Henry Jenkins, Convergence Culture: Where Old and New Media Collide, New York University Press 2006
Mark Gawlinski, Interactive Television Production, Focal Press, 2003
Janet Wasko, A Companion to Television, Blackwell Publishing, 2005
Trevor Slack, The Commercialisation of Sport, Routledge, 2004
Martin Cave, Kiyoshi Nakamura, Digital Broadcasting: Policy and Practice in the Americas, Europe and Japan, Edward Elgar Publishing, 2006

Television terminology